Sardar Mir Badshah Qaisrani (born 7 November 1965) is a Pakistani politician. He is also the 21st tribal chief of famous Baloch Tribe named "Qaisrani". He was a member of the Provincial Assembly of the Punjab PP-240 constituency of Taunsa Sharif from 2002 to 2013. He also served as Parliamentary Secretary for Industries, Commerce & Investment (2003–07). He returned to the Assembly for his second consecutive term in general elections 2008 and was Parliamentary Secretary for Forests on January 31, 2009, however, he resigned from the Assembly on April 17, 2010. 
He has been re-elected from the same constituency in bye-election held on June 5, 2010. His grandfather, Sardar Manzoor Ahmad Qaisarani was Member, Provincial Assembly of West Pakistan during 1965-1969 and his father served as Member, Punjab Assembly twice during 1990-93 and 1997-99.

References 

1971 births
Living people
Baloch people
Punjab MPAs 2013–2018
Pakistan Muslim League (N) politicians